The Society of Professional Audio Recording Services (SPARS) is an organization that holds conferences and publishes papers about the professional audio community. Its members include many of the top audio engineers working in the industry today.

SPARS was founded in 1979 as the Society of Professional Audio Recording Studios by the heads of eleven leading U.S. recording facilities. Among the co-founders were Mack Emerman of Criteria Studios, Chris Stone of Record Plant Studios, Joe Tarsia of Sigma Sound Studios, Howard Schwartz and Bob Liftin of Regent Sound, and Murray Allen of Universal Recording Corporation.

SPARS developed the SPARS Code, which was common on the back of CD covers from the late eighties to the mid nineties. It specified whether analogue or digital recording mediums were used in each process of the recording (recording, mixing, mastering).

References

External links
 SPARS Website

Audio engineering
Film and video technology
Music industry associations